This list of tallest buildings in Burnaby refers to the tallest buildings in the City of Burnaby, British Columbia, Canada. Burnaby is a city in the Lower Mainland of British Columbia located in Metro Vancouver. With an estimated population of 223,218 in 2011, it is British Columbia's third-most populous municipality. The city is in the midst of a massive construction boom which continues to drastically alter the city's skyline. As of 2020, Burnaby has 6 skyscrapers (over 150 metres), more than any other city within British Columbia.

Having developed as a suburb of Vancouver, Burnaby's growth is attributed to its proximity to that city. However, due to the price of doing business in Vancouver over the last several decades, Burnaby has developed a rather large corporate culture. Burnaby's extensive corporate employment opportunities differentiate it from most suburban bedroom communities. In addition, much of the highrise development has been transit oriented, with almost all towers being built near an Expo or Millennium Line station of the Skytrain, Metro Vancouver's light metro system. This has created more dense, vibrant urban centres that contrast with the sprawl in other parts of the city. 
The city has 4 separate skylines, of which Metrotown is by far the largest and is currently seeing the most development, the others are Highgate-Edmonds, Brentwood, and Lougheed. The tallest completed building is Altus at 187.8 m (including spire) tying it for 2nd tallest building in British Columbia.

Unlike neighbouring Vancouver, which limits building height to 200 meters in order to preserve sight-lines from the city out toward the Pacific Ranges, Burnaby does not limit building height, so long as the overall density of an area is within the city's limits.

Burnaby is currently in the midst of a building boom, with each of the four town centers seeing massive amounts of developments.

In Metrotown Town Center, the Station Square re-development adds 5 towers (the tallest at 52 floors). The proposed Concord Metrotown re-development will add 7 towers up to 65 floors tall. There are also numerous “twin tower” and single developments everywhere.

In Brentwood Town Center, The Amazing Brentwood will transform the Brentwood Shopping Mall with 11 new towers. Nearby, Appia Developments has 4 towers, named SOLO District, under construction. Concord Brentwood includes 11 more residential towers, and Gilmore Place by Onni is under construction, to add 7 more towers, the tallest of which is 214.8 Meters tall. Along with Metrotown, Brentwood also has numerous other towers under construction or proposed.

Lougheed Town Center is currently being re-developed into a new shopping mall, along with 20 residential towers. Nearby, SOCO is to bring 5 more towers to the center, and YMCA Burquitlam is planning an 8 tower development.

In Edmonds, King's Crossing is a three tower development at the intersection between Kingsway and Edmonds. Southgate City is proposed to bring 20 residential towers to Edmonds.

Tallest buildings
This list ranks buildings in Burnaby that stand at least 100 metres (328 ft) tall, based on CTBUH height measurement standards. This includes spires and architectural details but does not include antenna masts.

Projects

Under Construction

Proposed

See also

 List of tallest buildings in British Columbia
 List of tallest buildings in Vancouver
 List of tallest buildings in Coquitlam
 List of tallest buildings in Surrey

References

Tallest
Burnaby
Tallest buildings
Tallest buildings in Burnaby